Kevin Badcock (born 24 March 1951) is an Australian former cricketer. He played thirteen first-class matches for Tasmania between 1968 and 1976.

See also
 List of Tasmanian representative cricketers

References

External links
 

1951 births
Living people
Australian cricketers
Tasmania cricketers
Cricketers  from Launceston, Tasmania